Pain Agency is the second album by Scottish rock band Sucioperro, released on 4 May 2009 by Maybe Records.

Overview

Pain Agency was recorded in the band's studio in Ayr between June and October 2007. A video entitled 'The Making of Pain Agency' was created and posted on the band's YouTube page.

'Dragon's Pain Agency', a diary of events between the 10 June – 12 July written by the lead singer, was made available online from 16 July 2007 and includes information about recording developments, song titles, eating habits and progress through the computer game 'Black'.

The artwork for the Pain Agency era was designed by bassist Stewart Chown and Gordon Burniston. The style was carried across to the official Sucioperro website, which was also designed by Chown, until the site was updated for the release of the band's third album, The Heart String & How To Pull It.

Although the official release date was 4 May, the album became available to purchase at gigs from 27 April to coincide with the start of a substantial UK tour. A promotional copy of the album appeared on eBay on 13 April but was withdrawn by the seller later that day, apparently at the request of the record label.

A deluxe digital download, which contains extensive bonus material related to the Pain Agency era, was made available from the band's online shop in 2010.

Track listing

Editions
 Digipack CD
 A deluxe download that includes:
 Album versions of The Dissident Code and Mums' Bad Punk Music replaced with Single and EP mixes respectively
 Previously unreleased tracks, Ghosts And Shadows and Animals And Other Silent Types
 Pain Agency era b-sides
 A .pdf of the album booklet including lyrics for all songs and credits, extended to include additional tracks
 An audio commentary
 'Making Of...' video documentary
 A .pdf of 'Diary Of A Dragon'

Personnel
Vocals, guitars, drums, bass, keyboards and percussion: JP Reid & Fergus Munro
Production, Arrangement, Engineering and Composing: Sucioperro
Mixing: Chris Sheldon
Mastering: Richard Kayvan
Additional vocals: Janine Fearn, Jamie Lenman (on 'Are You Convinced'), Craig B (on 'Conception Territory'), Michael Logg & David Rossi
Additional guitars: David Aird

References

2009 albums
Sucioperro albums